Pop-up Pirate is a popular luck-based game for children manufactured by Tomy. It originated in Japan in 1975 under the name  and has seen many iterations over the years.

Rules
The pirate is placed into a spring-loaded barrel and rotated to randomize the unlucky slot. Players must take it in turns to insert plastic swords into slots in the side of the barrel. If a player inserts the sword into a specific slot (which changes randomly every time the game is played), the pirate is launched out of the barrel and the player is eliminated. The last player remaining after all others have been eliminated wins.

Educational value
According to Dominic Wyse, a professor of early childhood and primary education at University College London, the game improves children's motor skills, as well as in common with other games promoting turn-taking and having fun together with others.

Variations
Themed version
Alternate versions replacing the pirate with other subjects have been released. One of the earliest was a Mario-themed version released exclusively in Japan to advertise the game Super Mario World. Many versions followed in Japan, including Hard Gay, Monkey D. Luffy, The Good Dinosaur, a Buzz Lightyear-themed version to promote Toy Story 4, and many others replacing the pirate with different characters. One of the first variations of these to be released in America was a Darth Vader-themed version called Pop Up Darth Vader. Other variations of the game include Frozen, Despicable Me and Jurassic World.

Pop-up Pirate Treasure Island
A variation of Pop-up Pirate, Treasure Island adds board game elements by having players race to be the first person to collect 6 gold coins from a treasure chest Blackbeard is guarding. Only one key opens the treasure chest though.

Video game

Tomy has also released a video game version of Pop-up Pirate. Available as a WiiWare game, it was released in Japan on November 25, 2008, and in Europe on February 13, 2009.  The North America version is titled as Party Fun Pirate, which was released on April 13, 2009.

The game is essentially a digital version of the game, but also includes a single player logic puzzle mode. Players are also able to replace the pirate with one of their own Miis.

References

External links
Game description from Tomy
JP patent application for Pop-up Pirate's game
US patent application for Pop-up Pirate's game
Hard Gay version
Darth Vader version

Children's games
Takara Tomy
2008 video games
Tomy games
Video games about pirates
Video games based on Takara Tomy toys
Video games developed in Japan
Wii-only games
WiiWare games
Wii games